Muyu Urqu (Quechua muyu circle, urqu mountain, "circle mountain", Hispanicized spellings Muyuorco, Muyuorcco, Muyu Orcco, Muyu Orco, also Muyu Orqo, Muyuorqo, Muyu Urqo) is an archaeological site and a prominent hill in Peru. It is situated in the Cusco Region, Cusco Province, Santiago District, east of the mountain Araway Qhata, at the right bank of Watanay River.

See also 
 Anawarkhi
 Araway Qhata
 Pachatusan
 Pikchu
 Pillku Urqu
 Pumamarka
 Sinqa
 Wanakawri

References 

Archaeological sites in Peru
Archaeological sites in Cusco Region
Mountains of Peru
Mountains of Cusco Region